According to Willamette Week, "Though the first home of Portland's Korean immigrants was Gresham in the '60s, the 'Tron's manufacturing boom in the late '70s brought a wave of Korean immigrants to Beaverton in the Cedar Hills and downtown areas."

Portland has "great Korean food", according to Willamette Week, and many Korean restaurants. Notable restaurants include Han Oak, Kim Jong Grillin', Revelry, and Toki.

Lori Stegmann became the first Korean American Commissioner on the Multnomah County Board, and has been recognized by the Korean Society of Oregon for her work.

The Korean Temple Bell is installed outside the Oregon Convention Center.

See also
 Ethnic groups in Portland, Oregon
 Hispanics and Latinos in Portland, Oregon
 History of Chinese Americans in Portland, Oregon
 History of the Japanese in Portland, Oregon

References

History of Portland, Oregon
Korean-American culture by city